Eremias cholistanica is a species of lizard found in Pakistan.

References

Eremias
Reptiles described in 2006
Taxa named by Khalid Javed Baig
Taxa named by Rafaqat Masroor